Robert Buxton (c. 1533 – 15 November 1607), of Tibenham and Dickleburgh, Norfolk, was an English politician.

He was a Member of Parliament (MP) for Bramber in 1559, Horsham in 1563, and Arundel in 1584.

References

1533 births
1607 deaths
People from Dickleburgh
English MPs 1559
English MPs 1563–1567
English MPs 1584–1585